Education in the Bailiwick of Guernsey is the combined education systems of Guernsey, Alderney and Sark. In Guernsey, it is overseen by the Education Section of the Committee for Education, Sport and Culture, part of the States of Guernsey. The States manage a number of island schools, including three comprehensive secondary schools and one grammar school, as well as the island's higher education facility, the Guernsey Institute. There are also a number of private schools on the island.

Students at States-maintained schools must attend primary school from Reception to Year 6 (ages 4 to 11; Early Years Foundation, Key Stage 1 and Key Stage 2) and secondary school from Year 7 to 11 (ages 11 to 16; Key Stage 3 and Key Stage 4). At the end of Year 11. students typically take General Certificate of Secondary Education (GCSE) exams or other Level 1 or Level 2 qualifications. For students who do not pursue academic qualifications until the end of Year 13, these qualifications are roughly equivalent to the completion of high school in many other countries.

Education is compulsory from the age of 5 to the age of 16, however students may take A-levels at one of the Sixth Form facilities on the island or take other Level 3 qualifications at the only FE college on the island. 87% of 16-year olds will stay in Education post-16. Education is free for all students up to the age of 18. After graduating from Sixth Form, many students will study off-island, typically in England, at a Higher Education institution or on-island at the Guernsey Institute.

The education system is roughly similar to that used in England, with GCSEs graded 9-1 since 2017. National school examinations and vocational education qualifications are the same as those issued by the UK Ofqual and follow the Regulated Qualifications Framework used in the UK.

Reform 
Following a vote in the States, the decision was made to merge the present secondary schools into one schools, but across two sites, to be called Lisia School, with the campuses called Victor Hugo College and Saumarez College. The plans were backed with a £157 million investment from the States of Guernsey in 2019.

However, following a vote in March 2020, the States agreed to pause the plans and the Committee conducted a review of secondary education models.

The current proposals include:

 Two 11-18 colleges
 Three 11-18 colleges
 Two 11-16 colleges and one 11-18 college
 Three 11-18 colleges and a separate sixth form centre

All proposals continue to focus on the "one school" model, whereby executive leadership will be unified for the island.

List of schools 

The following is a list of schools in Guernsey. For Sark and Alderney, see below.

Primary schools

Amherst Primary School
Elizabeth College Junior School at Acorn House and Beechwood
Castel Primary School
Forest Primary School
Hautes Capelles Primary School
Herm Primary School
The Ladies' College Lower School
La Mare de Carteret Primary School
Les Voies School
La Houguette Primary School
Notre Dame du Rosaire Catholic Primary School
St Martin's Primary School
St Mary & St Michael Catholic Primary School
Vale Primary School
Vauvert Primary School

Secondary schools
Grammar School & Sixth Form Centre
La Mare de Carteret School
Les Beaucamps High School
St Sampson's High School

Special schools
Le Murier school
Le Rondin School & Centre

Independent schools
Blanchelande College
Elizabeth College
Ladies' College

Alderney and Sark 
Alderney and Sark have their own schools, each offering primary education and some secondary education for their respective residents.

 St Anne's School

 Sark School

References 

Education in Guernsey